The thirteenth series of the British science fiction television programme Doctor Who, subtitled Flux, was broadcast from 31 October to 5 December 2021. The series is the third and last to be led by Chris Chibnall as head writer and executive producer. It is the thirteenth to air following the programme's revival in 2005, and the thirty-ninth season overall. The series, initially announced in November 2019, was broadcast on Sunday nights, continuing the trend set by the previous two series. It was followed by three associated specials, all of which aired in 2022.

Jodie Whittaker returns for her third and final series as the Thirteenth Doctor, an incarnation of the Doctor, an alien Time Lord who travels through time and space in her ship, the TARDIS, which externally assumes the appearance of a British police box. The thirteenth series also stars Mandip Gill and John Bishop as the Doctor's travelling companions, playing Yasmin Khan and Dan Lewis, respectively. The series follows the Thirteenth Doctor and her companions as they navigate a universe-ending anomaly called the "Flux", while dealing with enemies and secrets from the Doctor's past.

The series consists of six episodes, which form a single story across the series. The six episodes were directed by Jamie Magnus Stone and Azhur Saleem; Stone returned from directing for the previous series, with Saleem directing as a new contributor. Chibnall wrote all six episodes of the series, co-writing one episode with Maxine Alderton, who also returned after writing for the previous series. Filming commenced in November 2020, and was completed by August 2021. The series has received generally positive reviews from critics.

Episodes

For the first time since The Trial of a Time Lord (1986), and the third time in the programme's history, the series tells one complete story across its entirety, rather than self-contained episodic stories. It is the second time where all episodes are encompassed by a single story number; The Key to Time (1978–79) maintained separate serial designations.

Casting 

The series is the third to feature Jodie Whittaker as the Thirteenth Doctor. Mandip Gill also returns as Yasmin Khan. Following the departures of Bradley Walsh and Tosin Cole in "Revolution of the Daleks" (2021), John Bishop joined the cast for the series as Dan Lewis.

Jacob Anderson appears in a recurring role as Vinder. Jo Martin returned as the Fugitive Doctor in "Once, Upon Time", having last appeared in the twelfth series episodes "Fugitive of the Judoon" and "The Timeless Children" (2020). Jemma Redgrave also reprises her role as Kate Stewart, a recurring character alongside the Eleventh and Twelfth Doctors, who was last seen in "The Zygon Invasion" / "The Zygon Inversion" (2015). Also appearing in recurring roles throughout the series are Thaddea Graham as Vinder's paramour Bel, Craige Els as the Lupari Karvanista, Rochenda Sandall and Sam Spruell as the villainous Ravagers Azure and Swarm, Annabel Scholey as Claire, and Kevin McNally as Professor Jericho.

Other guest actors in the series include Craig Parkinson as the Grand Serpent, Sara Powell as Mary Seacole, Gerald Kyd as General Logan, Penelope Ann McGhie as Mrs Hayward, Steve Oram as Joseph Williamson, Nadia Albina as Diane, Jonathan Watson as Commander Riskaw and Skaak, and Paul Broughton as Neville.

Production

Development
In May 2017, it was announced that due to the terms of a deal between BBC Worldwide and SMG Pictures in China, the company has first right of refusal on the purchase for the Chinese market of future series of the programme until and including Series 15. In October 2019, a deal was made between HBO Max and BBC for an additional two series of Doctor Who, including the thirteenth and fourteenth series.

The thirteenth series was announced by showrunner Chris Chibnall to be in development in November 2019, before the twelfth series premiered; Chibnall returns as the series' showrunner, having been in the role since the eleventh series.

Due to the COVID-19 pandemic's impact on television, the series' production included only eight episodes, reduced from the previous eleven. This was later announced to be shown as six episodes as part of the thirteenth series and two specials slated to air in 2022, with an additional special ordered for later that year as part of the BBC's centenary celebrations. The last episode would be Whittaker and Chibnall's last as star and executive producer respectively. The six-episode series also tells one complete narrative across its entirety, rather than episodic stories; this format was last used in The Trial of a Time Lord (1986). Chibnall stated, "Before we started making it, there were times when we thought we were going to be unable to do the show under Covid conditions this year… there were two ways you could go. You could go 'let's do lots of tiny little episodes in one room, with no monsters,' or we could throw down the gauntlet and do the biggest story we've ever done." Chibnall considered the latter approach more suitable, and said that it is "definitely the most ambitious thing we've done since we've been on the series." He would later reveal on the Radio Free Skaro podcast that the series narrowly escaped cancellation, and that he and Whittaker turned down other job offers to make it work: "There was a week where it was not going to be made. There was a week where I’d been offered another job." Chibnall also stated that for at least one hour, the series had effectively been axed.

In July 2021, near the end of filming, both Whittaker and Chibnall announced their intention to leave the programme following the series and three associated specials, to air by 2022. Chibnall explained that he and Whittaker had agreed to a "three series and out" pact, and that "now our shift is done, and we’re handing back the Tardis keys". In the BBC press release, Chibnall is quoted as saying: “I wish our successors - whoever the BBC and BBC Studios choose - as much fun as we’ve had. They’re in for a treat!”

Writing
Maxine Alderton, writer of the twelfth series episode "The Haunting of Villa Diodati", was listed on her CV as a "core writer" for the thirteenth series. In April 2020, Chibnall confirmed that writing for the series had commenced and continued remotely throughout the COVID-19 pandemic. Chibnall wrote all six episodes of the series, co-writing the fourth episode with Alderton.

Ed Hime, who wrote "It Takes You Away" (2018) and "Orphan 55" (2020) from the two past series, listed on his CV that he was set to write an episode for the series, as was Pete McTighe; however, Chibnall later stated in October 2021: "We had some other really great writers scheduled, but a lot of our plans had to be altered. Partly because the new series is a serial, partly because there are less episodes and partly because of the turnaround."

The story features some of Doctor Whos recurring aliens, including the Cybermen, Daleks, Ood, Sontarans, and Weeping Angels.

Filming 
According to production executive Tracie Simpson, pre-production for the thirteenth series was set to begin in June 2020, with filming originally set for September 2020. Filming eventually commenced in November 2020, and ran for ten months. Filming was still ongoing in July 2021 as confirmed at the San Diego Comic Con. Jamie Magnus Stone and Azhur Saleem directed episodes of the series, with Stone directing the first, second and fourth episodes, and Saleem directing the third, fifth and sixth episodes. Filming for the six episodes of the series, along with two of the 2022 specials, had concluded by August 2021.

Production blocks were arranged as follows:

Music
Segun Akinola returned to compose for the thirteenth series.

Release

Promotion 
The series was first promoted at San Diego Comic Con on 25 July 2021, where the first teaser trailer was released. Throughout October 2021, a Sontaran ship was projected over Liverpool, and the Doctor's "phone number" was released in a promotional message. On 8 October 2021, the social media accounts for Doctor Who went offline. Whittaker appeared in an episode of The Graham Norton Show on 15 October 2021 during which a second trailer was released.

Broadcast 
The series premiered on 31 October 2021 on BBC One, and aired through 5 December 2021. The six-episode series is collectively referred to under the subtitle Flux. In the United States the series aired the same day on BBC America where the streaming service AMC+ carried the streaming video on demand rights to new episodes. In Australia episodes are released same-day on ABC iview and broadcast on ABC TV Plus.

Home media

Reception

Ratings

Critical reception

Doctor Whos thirteenth series has received positive reviews from critics. Series 13 holds an 84% critic approval rating on online review aggregation site Rotten Tomatoes with an average score of 6/10, based on 58 critic reviews. Metacritic calculated a weighted average score of 68 out of 100 from six reviews, indicating "generally favorable reviews".

Awards and nominations

Soundtrack
30 selected pieces of score from this series as composed by Segun Akinola was released on digital music platforms on 30 September 2022 by Silva Screen Records, and was released on a 3-CD set on 11 November 2022. The physical release of the soundtrack includes twelve selected pieces of score from "Revolution of the Daleks" as the third disc, which were originally released on digital music platforms on 2 January 2021.

Notes

References

External links

 

2021 British television seasons
Series 13
Series 13